Proserpinellidae is a taxonomic family of land snails with an operculum,  terrestrial gastropod mollusks in the superfamily Helicinoidea (according to the taxonomy of the Gastropoda by Bouchet & Rocroi, 2005).

This family has no subfamilies according to the taxonomy of the Gastropoda by Bouchet & Rocroi, 2005.

Genera 
Genera within the family Proserpinellidae include:
 Proserpinella Bland, 1865, the type genus

References